Millbrook Football Club is a football club based in Southampton, England.

History
Bush Hill were formed in 2002, joining the Southampton Saturday League. In 2013, the club joined the Hampshire Premier League Division One, winning the league in their first season, gaining promotion to the Senior Division. In 2017 and 2019, the club won the Premier Division. On 10 March 2021, the club announced they would be renaming to Millbrook, to represent the area of Millbrook in Southampton, following the merger with Oakwood Youth. In 2021, the club was admitted into the Wessex League Division One. Millbrook entered the FA Vase for the first time in 2021–22.

Ground
The club currently play at Test Park in Southampton, following a spell at Mansel Park.

References

Sport in Southampton
Association football clubs established in 2002
2002 establishments in England
Football clubs in England
Football clubs in Hampshire
Hampshire Premier League
Wessex Football League
Southampton Saturday Football League